Frenchtown is an unincorporated community in Yuba County, California.

The town was started by a French man named Vavasseur.

References

Unincorporated communities in California
Unincorporated communities in Yuba County, California